Julian Pęski (1859–1920) was an ethnic Polish Russian Empire surgeon.

1859 births
1920 deaths
Surgeons from the Russian Empire
National University of Kharkiv alumni